The Peoria Symphony Orchestra is an American orchestra based in Peoria, Illinois conducted by George Stelluto. Founded in 1897 as Bradley University's Bradley Symphony Orchestra (under conductor Harold Plowe), it is the fourteenth oldest orchestra in the United States.  In 1915, the orchestra was incorporated as the Peoria Symphony Orchestra.

After Plowe retired in 1927, the next fifty years saw almost a dozen conductors lead the orchestra.  In 1978, William Wilsen became Musical Director, and led the group until 1999. Wilsen developed the orchestra's quality and repertoire, took it on tour to its sister city, Friedrichshafen, Germany, and led the PSO's celebration of its 100th year.  Conductor David Commanday was named Music Director in Spring of 1999.  During his tenure the orchestra was praised for its quality and imaginative programs:

"The Peoria Symphony Orchestra’s evolution under the baton of music director David Commanday has been fascinating to watch.  Orchestra members aren’t just showing up for another gig.  There’s a real joy in their playing, a certain esprit d/corps.  And the repertoire is getting more varied and more playful with every season.  The concerts – dare I say it? – actually are fun to attend” (Gary Panetta, Peoria Journal Star, 3/31/03).

David Commanday's leadership of the orchestra concluded at the end of the 2008–2009 season, marking a decade in which the institution had roughly doubled its endowment. George Stelluto became the music director at the beginning of the 2010–2011 season.

The orchestra performs at the Peoria Civic Center, and has featured soloists including Emanuel Ax, Joshua Bell, Evelyn Glennie, Hilary Hahn, Sharon Isbin, Yo-Yo Ma, and Itzhak Perlman.

External links 

 Official website
 Historic Peoria article

1898 establishments in Illinois
Musical groups established in 1898
Orchestras based in Illinois
Culture of Peoria, Illinois
Tourist attractions in Peoria, Illinois